Assia Touati (born 23 April 1995) is a French swimmer.

She competed in the 4×100 m freestyle relay event at the 2018 European Aquatics Championships, winning the gold medal.

References

1995 births
Living people
French female freestyle swimmers
European Aquatics Championships medalists in swimming
Mediterranean Games silver medalists for France
Mediterranean Games medalists in swimming
Swimmers at the 2018 Mediterranean Games
Swimmers at the 2022 Mediterranean Games
Swimmers at the 2020 Summer Olympics
20th-century French women
21st-century French women